Pilton is a town and a locality in the Toowoomba Region, Queensland, Australia. It is south of the city of Toowoomba.

Geography
The terrain in the north and south of the locality is more mountainous and is predominantly used for grazing on native vegetation. The terrain from the south-east to the north-west is within a valley through which Kings Creek flows from Upper Pilton through to Manapouri/Ascot and is ultimately a tributary of the Condamine River, past of the Murray-Darling basin. The valley is used for cropping.

The Gatton–Clifton Road (State Route 80) also passes through the locality from the south-west (Headington Hill) to the north-west (Hirstglen).

History
Pilton is named after a pastoral run which was excised from Clifton pastoral station in the 1840s.  The run was leased by Philip Pinnock, John Gammie, Joseph King and Joshua J. Whitting [from 1851-9]. It might have been named after Pilton, Somerset, England, an Old English name with Pil meaning creek and ton meaning an enclosed homestead.

Pilton Post Office opened on 27 March 1878 (though a receiving office for some years) and closed in 1977.

Pilton State School opened in November 1913.

The median age of the population was 41 years, and the median weekly household income was $866.

Education 
Pilton State School is a government primary (Prep-6) school for boys and girls at 24 Pilton Valley Road. In 2017, the school had an enrolment of 29 students with 3 teachers (2 full-time equivalent) and 6 non-teaching staff (3 full-time equivalent).

There is no secondary school in Pilton; the nearest secondary school is in Clifton.

Attractions 
The Darling Downs Zoo is in the south-west corner of the locality.

References

Toowoomba Region
Localities in Queensland